Diego Didier Bengolea Vargas (born December 7, 1979 in Cochabamba), is a Bolivian retired football midfielder.

Club career
Vargas' first club at the professional level was Wilstermann. After three good years and one national title among his achievements, Bengolea moved to San José, where he displayed his best performance yet, earning a spot in the national team. In 2004, he was signed by Aurora where he spent the next three seasons; however, his performance began to experience a decline. In 2007, he returned to Wilstermann but was relegated to the bench nearly the whole season. The following year he joined The Strongest. During the Clausura 2008 he suffered a serious knee injury that put his career to rest for several months. In August 2009, healed and once again ready to play he joined Bolívar.

International career
Between 2002 and 2003, Bengolea played for Bolivia in 5 games scoring one goal. He found the net on a friendly match against Chilean club Cobreloa on August 27, 2003 in La Paz.

Honours

Club
 Wilstermann
 Liga de Fútbol Profesional Boliviano: 2000

References

External links
 
 

1979 births
Living people
People from Cochabamba
Association football midfielders
Bolivian footballers
Bolivia international footballers
C.D. Jorge Wilstermann players
Club San José players
Club Aurora players
The Strongest players
Club Bolívar players
Universitario de Sucre footballers